
 
Vivonne is a commune in France.

Vivonne may also refer to:

People 
Louis Victor de Rochechouart de Mortemart (1636-1688), known by the name Vivonne
Catherine de Vivonne, marquise de Rambouillet (1588-1665), a member of the French nobility.

Places

Cape Vivonne, a headland located in the locality of Ceduna Waters, South Australia
Vivonne Bay (South Australia), a bay on Kangaroo Island in South Australia
Vivonne Bay, South Australia (locality), a locality
Vivonne Bay Conservation Park, a protected area in South Australia